Jaan Nuut (1874 in Tori Parish, Kreis Pernau – ?) was an Estonian politician. He was a member of II Riigikogu. He was a member of the Riigikogu since 24 November 1924. He replaced Hans Mitt. On 24 April 1925, he resigned his position and he was replaced by Peeter Järve.

References

1874 births
Year of death missing
People from Tori Parish
People from Kreis Pernau
Farmers' Assemblies politicians
Members of the Riigikogu, 1923–1926